Kang Chun-Ho  (강준호, born November 27, 1971 in South Korea) is a South Korean footballer.

Club career 
 1994–2001: LG Cheetahs / Anyang LG Cheetahs

Honours 
 Club
K League Champions: 2000
Korean FA Cup Winners: 1998
 Player
Korean FA Cup: 1998 MVP

Managing career  
He was FC Seoul reserve team coach in 2005 and appointed Daegu FC scouter in 2006, December.

References

External links
 

South Korean footballers
1971 births
Living people
FC Seoul players
FC Seoul non-playing staff
K League 1 players
Association football defenders